The Boer  or Boerbok is a South African breed of meat goat. It was selectively bred in the Eastern Cape from about 1920 for meat qualities and for the ability to survive by grazing on the thorn veldt of that region. It has been exported to many countries, and has been used to improve the meat qualities of other breeds.

History 

The Boer goat was bred from the indigenous South African goats kept by the Namaqua, San, and Fooku tribes, with some crossing of Indian and European bloodlines being possible. 

A census in the Cape Colony in 1891 found  head.

Characteristics 

Boer goats commonly have white bodies and distinctive brown heads. Some Boer goats can be completely brown or white or paint, which means large spots of a different color are on their bodies. Like the Nubian goat, they possess long, pendulous ears. They are noted for being docile, fast-growing, and having high fertility rates. Ewes are reported to have superior mothering skills as compared to other breeds. 
Boer goats tend to gain weight at about the same rate as their sire, so a ram from a proven fast-growing bloodline will command the highest price, as its offspring  tend to also be fast growers. The primary market for slaughter goats is a  kid; kids should reach marketable size at weaning age. The kid of a proven fast-growing sire might weigh  at 90 days, while the kid of a poor-quality sire might weigh only  at 90 days. An average-quality ram will initially be less expensive to purchase, but it can significantly undermine an operation's long-term profitability.

It is well adapted to grazing on a wide variety of local biomes, including sourveld, coastal veld, mixed veld and thornveld. It has a fast growth rate and good carcass qualities, good resistance to disease and good adaptation to hot, dry semi-desert conditions.

Use 

The Boer is a meat breed, and is reared principally for that reason. It may also be used in vegetation management, and is kept for this purpose in some areas of thornveld.

Boer goats are polyestrous (they can breed throughout the year), and they reach sexual maturity at five months of age. A typical breeding program is to produce three kid crops every two years, meaning the ewes are pregnant for five months, nurse their kids for three months, and then are rebred. Multiple births are common, and a 200% kid crop is achievable in managed herds. Usually, first-time ewes have one kid, but they may have more. After that, they usually have two kids every other breeding. The kids can be brown, black, white, or mixed.

Common crosses are Boer x Spanish goat, Boer x Angora goat, Boer x Kiko goat, Boer x Nubian goat, Boer x Sirohi, Boer x Osmanabadi, and Boer x Jamnapari goat. An effort to crossbreed with the Malabari goat has been controversial.

They may also be bred for show.

References 

Goat breeds
Meat goat breeds
Goat breeds originating in South Africa